Martyr A.D. is an American metalcore band formed in late 1999 from former members of the band Disembodied. Joel Johnson (guitar), Tara Johnson (bass) and Justin Kane (drums) joined with newcomers Charlie Johnson (guitar) and Mike Fisketti (vocals). After the departures of Kane and Fisketti in 2002, Andrew Hart and Karl Hensel from Minneapolis, Minnesota band Holding On took over on vocal and drum duties, respectively.

Martyr A.D. released their first album The Human Condition in Twelve Fractions with the indie label Ferret Music in 2001. The band's second and last album, On Earth as it is in Hell, was released on April 20, 2004, through Victory Records.

Martyr A.D. has toured with such bands as Poison the Well, Throwdown, The Haunted, Bury Your Dead, and Walls of Jericho.

The band disbanded for unknown reasons in April 2005. All three Johnsons (Joel, Tara, Charles) were featured in the reformation of Disembodied.

The band additionally reunited for a performance at This is Hardcore 2017.

Discography 
Human Condition demo (2000)
The Human Condition in Twelve Fractions (Ferret Music ; 2001)
Jared Demo (featuring Jared from 7 Angels 7 Plagues ; 2002)
Summer '03 Demo (2003)
On Earth as it is in Hell (Victory Records ; 2004)

Members 
Mike Paradise – drums (2017)
Michael James Fisketti – vocals
Joel Andrew Johnson – guitar
Charles Allan Johnson – guitar, vocals
Tara Lee Johnson – bass
Justin James Kane – drums
Andrew James Hart – vocals Summer '03 Demo,  On Earth as it is in Hell
Karl Englebert Hensel – drums Summer '03 Demo, On Earth as it is in Hell

References

External links 
Twin Cities Hardcore
Profile on Ferret Style
Martyr A.D. on nipp.com

Metalcore musical groups from Minnesota
Victory Records artists
Musical groups established in 2000
Musical groups disestablished in 2005
Ferret Music artists